Dome is a ghost town located in Yuma County, in southwestern Arizona, United States. It is located in the Dome Valley south of the Gila River. After the railroad passed by the site and an attempt at large scale mining of the placers began, a new post office was established as Dome in 1892 but soon closed when the attempt failed. Subsequently it opened and closed several times before finally closing in 1940.

Today the site lies along the Union Pacific's Sunset Route and a road that follows the old Overland stage route, south of the Wellton-Mohawk canal and Gila River. All that remains on the site is a large adobe building, one small adobe remnant and foundations. There is a cemetery nearby to the west.

References

External links
 Google Map of Dome, Arizona
 Lower Gila River Watershed
  Arizona Pioneer & Cemetery Research Project, Internet Presentation, Version 050710, Dome Cemetery and Gila City – Dome, Yuma County, Arizona, By Kathy and Ed Block, APCRP Historians
 Dome – Ghost Town of the Month at azghosttowns.com

Dome, Arizona
Dome, Arizona
Former populated places in Yuma County, Arizona
Stagecoach stops in the United States